Klaus-Uwe Will (born 25 June 1939) is an East German sprint canoer who competed in the late 1960s and early 1970s. He won a silver medal in the K-4 1000 m event at the 1970 ICF Canoe Sprint World Championships in Copenhagen.

Will also finished sixth in the K-4 1000 m event at the 1968 Summer Olympics in Mexico City.

References

Sport-reference.com profile

1939 births
Canoeists at the 1968 Summer Olympics
German male canoeists
Living people
Olympic canoeists of East Germany
ICF Canoe Sprint World Championships medalists in kayak